This is a list of Royal Navy ship names starting with G and H.

G

 G1
 G2
 G3
 G4
 G5
 G6
 G7
 G8
 G9
 G10
 G11
 G12
 G13
 G14
 G15
 Gabbard
 
 Gabriel Harfleur
 Gabriel Royal
 
 
 Gadwell
 Gael
 Gaiete
 Gaillarda
 
 Gainsborough
 Gala
 Galatea
 Galathee
 Galgo
 Galicia
 Gallant
 Gallarita

 Gallion
 Galliot
 Galteemore
 Gambia
 Gamston
 Ganges
 Ganges II
 Gannet
 
 Gardenia
 Gardiner
 Garland
 Garlies
 Garnet
 Garry
 Garth
 Gaspee
 Gatwick
 Gaul
 Gauntlet
 Gavinton
 Gavotte
 Gawler
 
 
 
 
 
 
 
 
 
 
 Gayundah
 Gazelle
 Gelykneid
 General Abercrombie
 
 
 
 
 General Grant
 General Monk
 General Platt
 
 Genereux
 Genista
 Genoa
 Gentian
 Gentille
 George
 George III
 Georgeham
 Georgetown
 Georgiana
 Geraldton
 Geranium
 Germaine
 Germoon Prize
 Gerrans Bay
 Geyser
 Ghurka
 
 
 Gibraltar Prize
 Gier
 Gifford
 
 Gift Minor
 Giles
 Gilia
 Gilliflower

 Gipsy
 Girdle Ness
 Girl Helen 
 Girl Mary
 Gironde
 Gladiator
 Gladiolus
 Glaisdale
 Glamorgan
 Glasgow
 Glasserton
 Glassford
 Glatton
 Gleaner
 Glenarm
 Glenearn
 Glengyle
 
 Glenroy
 Glentham
 Gloaming
 Globe
 Gloire
 Glommen
 Glorieux
 Gloriosa
 Glorioso
 Glorious
 
 Glory IV
 Gloucester
 
 Glowworm
 Gloxinia
 Gluckstadt
 Gnat
 Go Ahead
 Goathland
 Godetia
 Goelan
 Gold Coast

 Golden Falcon
 Golden Fleece
 Golden Horse
 Golden Lion
 Golden Rose
 Goldfinch
 Goliath
 Good Design
 Good Fortune
 Good Hope
 Good Intent
 Good Will
 Goodall
 
 Goodson
 Goodwin
 Goodwood
 Goole

 Gordon
 Gore
 Goree
 Gorey Castle
 Gorgon
 Gorleston
 Goshawk
 Gosport
 Gossamer
 Goulburn
 Gould
 Gown Hill
 Gozo
 Grace Dieu
 Grace of God
 Grace
 
 Grafton
 Gramont
 Grampian
 Grampus
 Grana
 

 Grand Turk
 Grandmistress
 
 Granicus
 Grantham
 Graph
 Grappler
 Grasshopper
 Gravelines
 Grayfly
 Grays
 Great Barbara
 Great Bark

 Great Elizabeth
 Great Galley
 Great Harry
 Great Nicholas
 Great Pinnace
 Great Zabra
 Greatford
 Grecian
 Green Linnet
 Greenfish
 Greenfly
 Greenock
 Greenwich
 Greetham
 Grenada
 Grenade
 Grenado
 Grenville
 Gretna
 Grey Fox
 Grey Wolf
 
 Greyhond
 Greyhound
 Griffin
 Griffon
 Grimsby
 Grindall
 Grinder
 Griper
 
 Grouper
 Grove
 Growler
 Guachapin
 Guadeloupe
 Guardian
 Guardland
 
 Guelderland
 Guepe
 Guernsey
 Guerriere
 Guilder De Ruyter
 Guildford Castle
 Guildford
 Guillemot
 Guinea
 Guinevere
 Gulland
 Gulnare
 Gurkha

H

 (H)1
 (H)2
 (H)3
 (H)4
 (H)5
 (H)6
 H1
 H2
 H3
 H4
 H5
 H6
 H7
 H8
 H9
 H10
 H11
 H12
 H13
 H14
 H15
 H16
 H17
 H18
 H19
 H20
 H21
 H22
 H23
 H24
 H25
 H26
 H27
 H28
 H29
 H30
 H31
 H32
 H33
 H34
 H35
 H36
 H37
 H38
 H39
 H40
 H41
 H42
 H43
 H44
 H45
 H46
 H47
 H48
 H49
 H40
 H51
 H52
 H53
 Haddock
 Hadleigh Castle
 Haerlem
 Halberd
 Halcyon
 Haldon
 Half Moon
 Halifax
 Halladale
 Halsham
 
 Halstead
 Hamadryad
 Hambledon
 Hampshire

 Hampton Court
 Handmaid
 Handy
 Hannam
 Hannibal
 
 
 
 
 Hardi
 Hardinge
 Hardy
 Hare
 Harebell
 Harfruen
 Hargood
 Harland
 Harlech
 Harlequin
 Harman
 
 Harp
 Harpenden
 Harpham
 Harpy
 Harrier
 Harriot
 Harrow
 Hart
 
 Hartland Point
 Hartlepool
 Harvester
 Harwich
 Hastings
 Hasty
 Hatherleigh
 Haughty
 Havannah
 Havant
 Havelock
 Haversham
 Havick
 Havock
 Hawk
 Hawke
 Hawkins
 Hawthorn

 Haydon
 Hayling
 Hazard Prize
 Hazard
 Hazardous
 
 Hazleton
 Heart of Oak
 Heartsease
 Hearty
 Heather
 Hebe
 Hecate
 Hecla
 Hector
 Hedingham Castle
 Heir Apparent
 Helder
 Helderenberg
 Heldin
 Helena
 Helford
 Helicon
 Heliotrope
 Helmsdale
 Helmsley Castle
 Helverson
 Hemlock
 
 Henrietta Maria
 
 Henry Galley
 Henry Grace à Dieu

 Henry of Hampton
 Henry Prize
 Hepatica
 Herald
 Hercules
 Hereward
 Hermes
 Hermione
 Herne Bay
 Hero
 Heroine
 Heron
 Hesper
 Hesperus
 Hestor
 Heureux
 Hever Castle
 Hexham
 Hexton
 Heythrop
 Hibernia
 Hibiscus
 Hickleton
 Highburton
 Highflyer
 Highlander
 Highway
 Hilary
 Hildersham
 Himalaya
 Hinchinbrook
 Hind
 Hindostan
 Hindustan
 Hinksford
 Hippomenes
 
 Hobart
 Hodgeston
 Hogue
 Holcombe
 Holderness
 Holdernesse
 Holighost
 Holigost Spayne
 Holigost
 
 
 
 
 
 
 Hollesley Bay
 Holly
 Hollyhock
 Holm Sound
 Holmes
 Holstein
 Honesty
 Honeysuckle
 Hong Kong
 
 Hood
 

 Hope Prize
 Hopewell
 
  Horatio
 Hornby
 Hornet
 Hornpipe
 Horseman
 Horsleydown
 Hoste
 Hostile
 Hotham
 Hotspur
 Houghton
 Hound
 House de Swyte
 Hoverfly
 Hovingham
 Howe
 Howett
 Howitzer
 Hubberston
 Hugh Lindsay
 Hugh Rose
 Hughes
 Hulvul
 Humber
 Hunter
 Huntley
 Huron
 Hurricane
 Hursley
 
 Hurst Castle
 Hurworth
 Hussar
 Hyacinth
 Hyaena
 Hyderabad
 Hydra
 Hydrangea
 Hygeia
 Hyperion
 Hythe

See also
 List of aircraft carriers of the Royal Navy
 List of amphibious warfare ships of the Royal Navy
 List of pre-dreadnought battleships of the Royal Navy
 List of dreadnought battleships of the Royal Navy
 List of battlecruisers of the Royal Navy
 List of cruiser classes of the Royal Navy
 List of destroyer classes of the Royal Navy
 List of patrol vessels of the Royal Navy
 List of frigate classes of the Royal Navy
 List of monitors of the Royal Navy
 List of mine countermeasure vessels of the Royal Navy (includes minesweepers and mine hunters)
 List of Royal Fleet Auxiliary ship names
 List of submarines of the Royal Navy
 List of survey vessels of the Royal Navy
 List of Royal Navy shore establishments

References
 

 G
Names G
Royal Navy G
Royal Navy ships G